John Alston Wallace (1828 – 17 October 1901) was an Australian politician

Born in Rutherglen near Glasgow to draper James Wallace, he became a draper and miner in Renfrewshire, but when his first wife died in 1852 he emigrated to Melbourne, where he briefly returned to mining before becoming a storekeeper in Bendigo. He had several stores, hotels and businesses in the area and was an investor in a number of companies. In 1865 he married Theresa Monahan, with whom he had eight children; he would later remarry Ada Reid. In 1873 he was elected to the Victorian Legislative Council for Eastern Province, switching to North-Eastern Province in 1882 and serving until his death at Elsternwick in 1901.

References

1828 births
1901 deaths
Members of the Victorian Legislative Council
Scottish emigrants to Australia
Politicians from Melbourne
People from Rutherglen
People from Bendigo
19th-century Australian politicians